The Sixth Assessment Report (AR6) of the United Nations (UN) Intergovernmental Panel on Climate Change (IPCC) is the sixth in a series of reports which assess scientific, technical, and socio-economic information concerning climate change. Three Working Groups (WGI, II, and III) covered the following topics: The Physical Science Basis (WGI); Impacts, Adaptation and Vulnerability (WGII); Mitigation of Climate Change (WGIII). Of these, the first study was published in 2021, the second report February 2022, and the third in April 2022. The final synthesis report was finished in March 2023.

The first of the three working groups published its report on 9 August 2021, Climate Change 2021: The Physical Science Basis. A total of 234 scientists from 66 countries contributed to this first working group (WGI) report. The authors built on more than 14,000 scientific papers to produce a 3,949-page report, which was then approved by 195 governments. The Summary for Policymakers (SPM) document was drafted by scientists and agreed to line-by-line by the 195 governments in the IPCC during the five days leading up to 6 August 2021.

In a front-page story, The Guardian described the report as "its starkest warning yet" of "major inevitable and irreversible climate changes", a theme echoed by many newspapers as well as political leaders and activists around the world.

Production

History 
After the IPCC had been founded in 1988, the First Assessment Report (AR1) was published in 1990 and received an update in 1992. In intervals of about six years, new editions of IPCC Assessment Report followed: AR2 in 1995, AR3 in 2001, AR4 in 2007, and AR5 in 2014.

In April 2016, at the 43rd session which took place in Nairobi, Kenya, the topics for three Special Reports (SR) and one methodology report on Greenhouse Gases (GHG) inventories in the AR6 assessment cycle were decided. These reports were completed in the interim phase since the finalisation of the Fifth Assessment Report and the publication of results from the Sixth Assessment Report.

Sequence of release dates:
 Special Report on Global Warming of 1.5 °C (SR15) in October 2018
 2019 Refinement to the 2006 IPCC Guidelines for National Greenhouse Gas Inventories in May 2019
 Special Report on Climate Change and Land (SRCCL) in August 2019
 Special Report on the Ocean and Cryosphere in a Changing Climate (SROCC) in September 2019

Structure 
The sixth assessment report is made up of the reports of three working groups (WG I, II, and III) and a synthesis report which concluded the assessment in early 2023.

 The Physical Science Basis of Climate Change in August 2021 (WGI contribution)
 Impacts, Adaptation and Vulnerability in February 2022 (WGII contribution)
 Mitigation of Climate Change in April 2022 (WGIII contribution)
 Synthesis Report in March 2023

Leaks 
During the preparation of the three main AR6 reports, a small group of scientists leaked some information on the results of Working Group III (Mitigation of Climate Change) through the organization Scientist Rebellion. As governments can change the summaries for policymakers (SPM) for IPCC reports, the scientists were afraid that politicians might dilute this information in the summary. These efforts require strong changes in lifestyle and economy.

Geopolitics 
Geopolitics has been included in climate models for the first time, in the form of five Shared Socioeconomic Pathways: SSP1 "Taking the Green Road", SSP2 "Middle of the Road", SSP3 "A Rocky Road", SSP4 "A Road Divided", and SSP5 "Taking the Highway", which have been published in 2016.

Those pathways assume that international cooperation and worldwide increase in GDP will facilitate adaptation to climate change. The geopolitical pathways served as one of the sources for the formation of the Shared Socioeconomic Pathways in the report among with other sources. One of the assumptions is that enough GDP and technology derived from fossil fuels development will permit to adapt even to  temperature rise.

The report explicitly says: "Each pathway is an internally consistent, plausible and integrated description of a socio-economic future, but these socio-economic futures do not account for the effects of climate change, and no new climate policies are assumed. ... By design, the evolution of drivers and emissions within the SSP scenarios do not take into account the effects of climate change."

Participation 
Like other major international scientific processes, the IPCC has been accused of not sufficiently including scholars from the Global South. For example, the biases were highlighted that prevent African scholars from participating, such as publication requirements and being an expert reviewer before joining the panel of contributors. Similarly, the physical sciences report only had 28% women in its team of authors.

The Physical Science Basis (Working Group 1 report) 

A total of 234 scientists from 66 countries contributed to the first of three working group reports. Working group 1 (WGI) published Climate Change 2021: The Physical Science Basis. The report's authors built on more than 14,000 scientific papers to produce a 3,949-page report, which was then approved by 195 governments. The Summary for Policymakers (SPM) document was drafted by scientists and agreed to line-by-line by the 195 governments in the IPCC during the five days leading up to 6 August 2021. It was published on Monday, 9 August 2021.

According to the report, it is only possible to avoid warming of 1.5 °C or 2 °C if massive and immediate cuts in greenhouse gas emissions are made. In a front-page story, The Guardian described the report as "its starkest warning yet" of "major inevitable and irreversible climate changes", a theme echoed by many newspapers around the world.

The Technical Summary (TS) provides a level of detail between the Summary for Policymakers (SPM) and the full report. In addition, an interactive atlas was made "for a flexible spatial and temporal analysis of both data-driven climate change information and assessment findings in the report." Following IPCC protocol adopted in May 2011, errata were and are being compiled. Thirty-four questions were published as part of the FAQs section, with each one related to a chapter of the report. Regional fact sheets were made available for geographic regions of the globe, drawing on facts from the reports. The data for the SPM are being held and visible at the UK Centre for Environmental Data Analysis website. Computer slides were made available as part of the "Outreach Materials" , for press conferences and basic presentations.

Findings 
The Working Group 1 (WGI) report, Climate Change 2021: The Physical Science Basis comprises thirteen chapters and is focused on the foundational consensus of the climate science behind the causes and effects of human greenhouse gas emissions. Compared with previous assessments, the report included much more detail on the regional effects of climate change, although more research is needed on climate change in eastern and central North America. Sea-level rise by 2100 is likely to be from half to one metre, but two to five metres is not ruled out, as ice sheet instability processes are still poorly understood.

However, Joeri Rogelj, director of the Grantham Institute and a lead IPCC author, said that it is possible to completely avoid warming of 1.5 °C, but to achieve that the world would need to cut emissions by 50% by the year 2030 and by 100% by the year 2050. If the world does not begin to drastically cut emissions by the time of the next report of the IPCC, then it will no longer be possible to prevent 1.5 °C of warming. SSP1-1.9 is a new pathway with a rather low radiative forcing of 1.9 W/m2 in 2100 to model how people could keep warming below the 1.5 °C threshold. But, even in this scenario, the global temperature peaks at 1.6 °C in the years 2041–2060 and declines after.

According to AR6 coauthors, the probable temperature rise is in the middle of the scenario spectrum that reaches from 1.5 °C to 5 °C, at about 3 °C at the end of the century. It is likely that 1.5 °C will be reached before 2040. The threats from compound impacts are rated higher than in previous IPCC reports. The famous hockey stick graph has been extended.

Extreme weather is expected to increase in line with temperature, and compound effects (such as heat and drought together) may impact more on society. The report includes a major change from previous IPCC in the ability of scientists to attribute specific extreme weather events.

The global carbon budget to keep below 1.5 °C is estimated at 500 billion more tonnes of greenhouse gas, which would need the whole world to be net zero before 2050. Staying within this budget, if counting from the beginning of the year 2020, gives a 50% chance to stay below 1.5 °C. For having a 67% chance, the budget is 400 billion tonnes and for an 83% chance it is 300 billion tonnes. The report says that rapidly reducing methane emissions is very important, to make short-term gains to buy time for carbon dioxide emission cuts to take effect.

Any future warming will increase the occurrence of extreme weather events. Even in a 1.5 °C temperature rise there will be "an increasing occurrence of some extreme events unprecedented in the observational record". The likelihood of more rare events increases more.

The frequency, and the intensity of such events will considerably increase with warming, as described in the following table:

Reception

In science 
The publication of the report was during the Northern Hemisphere summer, where there was much extreme weather, such as a Western North America heat wave, flooding in Europe, extreme rainfall in India and China, and wildfires in several countries. Some scientists are describing these extreme weather events as clear gaps in the models used for writing the report, with the lived experience proving more severe than the consensus science.

In politics 
After publication of the Working Group 1 report, EU Vice President Frans Timmermans said that it is not too late to prevent runaway climate change. UK Prime Minister Boris Johnson said that the next decade will be pivotal to the future of the planet.

Rick Spinrad, administrator of the US's National Oceanic and Atmospheric Administration, stated that his agency "will use the new insights from this IPCC report to inform the work it does with communities to prepare for, respond to, and adapt to climate change".

NGO 
Swedish climate activist Greta Thunberg said that the report "confirms what we already know from thousands [of] previous studies and reports—that we are in an emergency".

In media 
In a front-page story, dedicated to the report  The Guardian described it as "starkest warning yet" of "major inevitable and irreversible climate changes". This message was echoed by many media channels after the release of the report.

According to CTXT, the publication that first posted the leaked materials from the report: "it showed that the global economy must be shifted rapidly away from a reliance on conventional GDP growth, but that the report underplays this."

From the United Nations 
The Secretary-General of the UN, António Guterres, called the report a "code red for humanity".

Climate Change 2022: Impacts, Adaptation & Vulnerability (Working Group 2 report) 
The second part of the report, a contribution of working group II (WGII), was published on 28 February 2022. Entitled Climate Change 2022: Impacts, Adaptation & Vulnerability, the full report is 3675 pages, plus a 37-page summary for policymakers. It contains information on the impacts of climate change on nature and human activity. Topics examined included biodiversity loss, migration, risks to urban and rural activities, human health, food security, water scarcity, and energy. It also assesses ways to address these risks and highlights how climate resilient development can be part of a larger shift towards sustainability. 

The report found that climate impacts are at the high end of previous estimates, with all parts of the world being affected. At least 3.3 billion people, about 40% of the world population, now fall into the most serious category of "highly vulnerable", with the worst effects in the developing world. If emissions continue on their current path, Africa will lose 30% of its maize cultivation territory and 50% of its land cultivated for beans. One billion people face flooding due to sea level rise. Climate change, together with other factors, also increases the risk of infectious diseases outbreaks like the COVID-19 pandemic. The report also cites evidence that China will pay the highest financial cost if the temperature continue to rise. The impacts will include food insecurity, water scarcity, flooding, especially in coastal areas where most of the population lives due to higher than average sea level rise, and more powerful cyclones. At some point part of the country may face wet-bulb temperatures higher than humans and other mammals can tolerate more than six hours. Overall, the report identified 127 different negative impacts of climate change, some of them irreversible.

People can protect themselves to some degree from the effects of climate change, which is known as adaptation. Overall, progress on adaptation has been made in all sectors and regions, although this progress is unevenly distributed and many initiatives prioritise immediate risks over longer-term transformational changes.  Still, there are feasible and effective adaptation options available and many adaption actions have benefits beyond reducing climate risks, including positive effects on the Sustainable Development Goals. For example, the majority of current adaptations address water-related risks; adaptations like improved water management, water storage and irrigation reduce vulnerability and can also provide economic and ecological benefits.  Similarly, adaptation actions like agroforestry, farm- and landscape diversification and urban agriculture can increase food availability, while at the same time improving sustainability.  

WGII further highlighted the need for conservation in order to maintain biodiversity, and mitigate the effects of climate change. The report reads, "Recent analyses, drawing on a range of lines of evidence, suggest that maintaining the resilience of biodiversity and ecosystem services at a global scale depends on effective and equitable conservation of approximately 30% to 50% of Earth's land, freshwater and ocean areas, including currently near-natural ecosystems." The report was critical of technological approaches to carbon dioxide removal, instead indicating that urbanisation could help drive adoption of mitigation strategies such as public transport and renewable energy. The report also warns there are high risks associated with strategies such as solar radiation management; planting forests in unnatural locations; or "poorly implemented bioenergy, with or without carbon capture and storage".

The report puts considerable emphasis on adaptation limits. It states that some human and natural systems already reached "soft adaptation limits" including human systems in Australia, Small Islands, America, Africa and Europe and some natural systems reach even the "hard adaptation limits" like part of corals, wetland, rainforests, ecosystems in polar and mountain regions. If the temperature rise will reach 1.5 °C (2.7 °F) additional ecosystems and human systems will reach hard adaptation limits, including regions depending on glaciers and snow water and small islands. At 2 °C (3.6 °F) temperature rise, soft limits will be reached by many staple crops in many areas while at 3 °C (5.4 °F) hard limits will be reached by parts of Europe.

In line with the emphasis on adaptation limits, the report also highlights loss and damage, meaning negative consequences of climate change that cannot be avoided through adaptation. The report states that such losses and damages are already widespread: droughts, floods and heatwaves are becoming more frequent, and a mass extinction is already underway. Taking near-term actions to limit warming to below 1.5°C would substantially reduce future losses and damages, but cannot eliminate them all. Previously, rich countries have resisted taking responsibility for these lossess. 

The report states that even a temporary overshoot of the 1.5 degree limit will lead to negative effects on humans and ecosystems. According to the report: "Depending on the magnitude and duration of overshoot, some impacts will cause release of additional greenhouse gases (medium confidence) and some will be irreversible, even if global warming is reduced (high confidence)". Climate resilient development will be more difficult if the global temperature will rise by 1.5 degrees above pre-industrial levels, while if it will rise by more than 2 degrees it will become impossible "in some regions and sub-regions". Moreover, climate resilient development can have both adaptation and mitigation benefits, but it requires international cooperation and collaborations with local communities and organisations.

Reactions 
Responding to the report, António Guterres, Secretary-General of the United Nations, called it "an atlas of human suffering and a damning indictment of failed climate leadership" and "the facts are undeniable ... the world's biggest polluters are guilty of arson of our only home." The United States special presidential envoy for climate, John Kerry, said "We have seen the increase in climate-fuelled extreme events, and the damage that is left behind – lives lost and livelihoods ruined. The question at this point is not whether we can altogether avoid the crisis – it is whether we can avoid the worst consequences."

Environmentalist Inger Andersen commented: "Nature can be our saviour ... but only if we save it first."

The report was published during the first week of the 2022 Russian invasion of Ukraine. In the context of the conflict, the Ukrainian delegation connected the Russian aggression to the global dependency on oil, and a Russian official, Oleg Anisimov, apologized for the conflict despite the possible repercussions. The Ukrainian delegation also called for news reporting on the war not to overshadow the WGII report.

Climate Change 2022: Mitigation of Climate Change (Working Group 3 report) 
The report was presented on 4 April 2022. The structure of the report was adopted in 2017. Some observers are worried that the conclusions might be watered down, considering the way the reports are adopted. According to The Observer, some countries "have sought to make changes that would weaken the final warnings".

WGIII found that "net anthropogenic GHG emissions have increased since 2010 across all major sectors globally. An increasing share of emissions can be attributed to urban areas. Emissions reductions in CO2 from fossil fuels and industrial processes, due to improvements in energy intensity of GDP and carbon intensity of energy, have been less than emissions increases from rising global activity levels in industry, energy supply, transport, agriculture and buildings."

Areas of focus 
Matters covered by the report include:

 Trends and drivers of greenhouse gas emissions;
 Emission reduction pathways that match up with long-term net-zero goals;
 Shorter-term pathways for emission reductions and their compatibility with “national development objectives” for job creation, competitiveness, poverty, sustainable development, and more;
 Social aspects of greenhouse gas emission reductions, including objectives to meet human needs under the UN Sustainable Development Goals;
 Energy systems;
 Agriculture, forestry, and other land uses;
 Cities and other human settlements;
 Buildings;
 Transportation;
 Industry;
 Costs and opportunities across different economic sectors;
 National and sub-national policies and institutions;
 International cooperation;
 Investment and finance;
 Innovation, technology, and technological transfer;
 Connections between sustainable development and the response to climate change.

Important findings 
The report uses some new approaches like to include different social aspects, the participation of youth, indigenous people, cities, businesses in the solution. It states that "International cooperation is a critical enabler for achieving ambitious climate change mitigation goals." International cooperation has positive and measurable effect on climate mitigation. It provides critical support for many mitigation measures. Participation in international agreements leads to adoption of climate policies. For preventing global temperature from rising more than 2 degrees above the preindustrial level, international cooperation needs to be much stronger than now as many developing countries need support from other countries higher than present for strong climate action.

According to the report demand side mitigation measures can reduce GHG emissions by 40–70% by the year 2050 compared to scenarios in which countries will fulfill its national pledges given before 2020. For being implemented successfully those measures should be linked "with improving basic wellbeing for all".

The report says that in order to achieve net zero emissions, it is necessary to employ carbon dioxide removal technologies. The report compares different methods of carbon dioxide removal (CDR) including agroforestry, reforestation, blue carbon management, restoration of peatland and others.

Cities have great potential for reducing greenhouse gas emissions. Without any action, cities are supposed to emit 65 GtCO2-eq by the year 2050. With full scale mitigation action the emissions could be brought down to near zero, with the worst case scenario assuming a non-mitigatable remainder of 3 GtCO2-eq. City planning, supporting mixed use of space, transit, walking, cycling and sharing vehicles can reduce urban emissions by 23–26%. Urban forests, lakes and other blue and green infrastructure can reduce emissions directly and indirectly (e.g. by reducing the energy demand for cooling).

Buildings received significant attention. Buildings emitted 21% of global GHG emissions in the year 2019. 80–90% of their emissions can be cut while helping to achieve other Sustainable Development Goals. The report introduces a new scheme for reducing GHG emissions in buildings: SER = Sufficiency, Efficiency, Renewable. Sufficiency measures do not need very complex technology, energy supply, maintenance or replacement during the life of the building. Those include, natural ventilation, green roofs, white walls, mixed use of spaces, collective use of devices etc. There are multiple links between emissions from buildings and emissions from other sectors including those discussed in chapters 6, 7, 8, 10 and 11. Reducing GHG emissions from buildings is linked to sharing economy and circular economy.

The report found that there is no evidence that sustainable development requires fossil fuels. Climate journalist Amy Westervelt reacting to the report, described this finding as one of the most radical, debunking a common refrain by energy poverty advocates, that development requires use of fossil fuels.

The IPCC found that decent living standards could be achieved using less energy than prior consensus assumed. According to the report for reaching well being for all, the required energy consumption is "between 20 and 50 GJ cap-1 yr-1 depending on context." More equitable income distribution can lower emissions. Mitigation pathways based on low demand and high efficiency can achieve decent living standards and well being for all. Pathways based on reducing consumption, involving sustainable development have less negative outcomes than pathways based on high consumption and narrow mitigation. Table TS.29 shows that mitigation measures in the urban, buildings, AFOLU and transport sectors have considerably more synergies and less trade offs with sustainable development goals than measures in the energy sector while the latter (less trade offs) also holds true for the industry sector. According to table TS30, narrow mitigation can increase habitat loss by 600%, while avoiding habitat degradation by around 95%. Mitigation with sustainable development did not harm forest cover and biodiversity.

International cooperation gives the possibility to achieve climate change mitigation without compromising sustainable development goals.

The report mentions some improvement in global climate action. For example, the rate of deforestation slowed after 2010 and the total forest cover increased in the latest years due to reforestation in Europe, Asia and North America.

Responses 
The Secretary-General of the United Nations, António Guterres, said the report described "litany of broken climate promises [by policy makers]" and in his remarks called for more action, saying "Climate activists are sometimes depicted as dangerous radicals. But, the truly dangerous radicals are the countries that are increasing the production of fossil fuels."

References

External links 
 IPCC Website
 Official IPCC Sixth Assessment Report website
 Official IPCC AP6 WG1 Report Website
 IPCC WGI Interactive Atlas
 Official IPCC AP6 WG2 Report Website
 Official IPCC AP6 WG3 Report Website
 IPCC-related news from The Guardian newspaper

Climate change assessment and attribution
Report, 06